is a former Japanese swimmer who competed in the 1984 Summer Olympics.

References

1965 births
Living people
Japanese male butterfly swimmers
Olympic swimmers of Japan
Swimmers at the 1984 Summer Olympics
20th-century Japanese people